Latin Sparks Festival is Canada’s largest Latin dance party that occurs annually in Ottawa, Ontario and Toronto, Ontario, Canada. In 2018, over 3,000 people attended the festival in each city for one night of dancing.
 
Latin Sparks Festival has grown from a one-night event in Ottawa to a 4-day event in both Ottawa and Toronto. Festival highlights include: a boat party, free of charge dance workshops, Latin street food, bars, DJs, live performances, multiple dance floors and a hangover brunch.

History
Latin Sparks made its debut in 2012 as a weekly, summer event at a patio restaurant. The event was organized by two friends. Typically, only 40 people attended.

2013
The festival took place on a fenced-off portion of Sparks Street, attracting approximately 1,500 guests per event. The festival consisted of 3 events held during the summer.

2014
During this year, the festival consisted of 5 events and attracted 4,000 guests. The festival was held on Sparks Street and covered one block.

2015
For the first time, the festival was a one day event that featured 2 live bands - a Cuban orchestra playing salsa and a Brazilian 25-piece Batucada playing a mix of percussions and horns. This event attracted approximately 6,000 attendees and covered 2 blocks of Sparks Street.

2016
Due to increased popularity, the festival moved to Albert Island for one night of Latin dancing in the open air. Albert Island is directly behind the Canadian War Museum and beside Lebreton Flats. The new venue is accessible from Booth Street and overlooks the Ottawa River. Latin Sparks 2016 attracted an estimated 3,000 attendees.

2017
Latin Sparks Festival was held on Albert Island again. As Canadians of Latin American descent make up one of the largest non-European ethnic groups in the country, this festival demonstrated the vibrancy and diversity of their culture in the Canada's 150th anniversary edition.

2018
Latin Sparks Festival expanded to Toronto and took place on Saturday, August 18. For a first time event in Toronto, the festival attracted 3,500 attendees. The Ottawa Festival still took place in Albert Island on Saturday, June 9 and attracted 4,500 attendees. Both Festivals were sold out.

2019
The 4-day festival will occur in Ottawa from Thursday, 30 May to Sunday, 2 June. The Main Event: Block Party on Albert Island will start at 6PM with a performance from Yani Borell accompanied by a live Salsa band. The Block Party will go on until at 2AM.  Latin Sparks Festival in Toronto will occur from Thursday, 15 August to Sunday, 18 August and follow a similar schedule to the Ottawa Festival. The festival schedule consists of a Social Dance, Boat Party, Dance Bootcamp, Main Event and Hangover Brunch. The schedule is available on their website latinsparks.ca.

2021
With 2020 being cancelled and the festival going on hiatus instead, it'll return in 2021.

Sponsors
The festival has been supported by private companies and various government bodies such as: the Ministry of Tourism, Culture and Sport, the City of Ottawa, Toronto Arts Council, Ontario Arts Council, Hot 89.9 FM, Labatt Brewery Company, Modelo Especial, Cellection and various local Latin American restaurants.

See also
Latin American Culture
Latin dance
List of festivals in Ottawa

References

External links
Official Website

Festivals in Ottawa